Toda Aznárez (Basque: Tota Aznar; d. 15 October 958), known as Toda of Pamplona, was queen of Pamplona by her marriage to Sancho I. She ruled the kingdom as regent during the minority of her son García Sánchez I from 931. She was herself descended from the previous royal dynasty, Aritza.

Family 

Toda was the daughter of Aznar Sánchez, lord of Larraun, paternal grandson of King García Íñiguez of Pamplona, while her mother Onneca Fortúnez was a daughter of King Fortún Garcés. Thus, Toda was a descendant of the Aritza dynasty of Navarrese monarchs. Toda was an aunt or cousin of Caliph Abd-al-Rahman III. Toda was married to King Sancho I of Pamplona, with whom she had the following children:

 Urraca, queen of León from 931 until 951 as the wife of Ramiro II
 Oneca, queen of León from 926 until 931 as the wife of Alfonso IV
 Sancha, countess of Castile as the wife of Fernán González
 Velasquita, married first to Count Munio Vélaz of Álava, then to Galindo of Ribagorza, and finally to Fortún Galindez.
 Orbita
 García I, king of Pamplona from 925 until 970

Having died while their son was still underage, Toda's husband was succeeded by his brother Jimeno Garcés, who was married to Toda's sister Sancha.

Regency
With the death of her brother-in-law King Jimeno in 931, Queen Toda became regent and guardian for her young son, García Sánchez I. In 934 Toda signed a treaty pledging allegiance to her nephew Abd-ar-Rahman III, and released hostages of the Banu Di n-Nun clan, the caliph confirming the rule of her son García (this has sometimes been interpreted as an act of the Caliph to liberate García from his mother's direct control). This led to the rebellion in Falces by a count Fortún Garcés, an "irascible man who hated Muslims", the uprising being suppressed with Cordoban arms. Toda violated her treaty in 937, forcing a punitive campaign.

During several stretches she appears in the royal charters of the kingdom to the exclusion of her daughter-in-law, the queen, from 947 to 955, and again in 959. In 958 she was ruling her own subkingdom, in the area of Degio and Lizarra, towns not otherwise identified.

The same year, she took an interest in the health of her Leonese grandson Sancho I, whose obesity was largely responsible for his dethronement. Toda requested the assistance of Abd-ar-Rahman III, the Caliphate of Córdoba being renowned for its physicians. The caliph sent her his Jewish physician Hasdai ibn Shaprut, who promised to cure Sancho on condition that Toda visit the city of Córdoba. Therefore, Toda, her son García Sánchez I of Pamplona and grandson Sancho I of León, nobles and clergymen arrived in Córdoba, where they were received with full honors and amid much pomp. The arrival of this Christian queen in the capital of an Islamic caliphate enhanced Abd-ar-Rahman III's prestige among his subjects, and is considered a landmark in the history of medieval diplomacy. Sancho's medical treatment was successful, and he was "relieved from his excessive corpulence."

Toda was an energetic diplomat, arranging political marriages for her daughters among the competing royalty and nobility of Christian Iberia. She died in 958

Notes

References

Sources

 

 Collins, Roger, "Queens-Dowager and Queens-Regnant in Tenth-Century León and Navarre", in John Carmi Parsons, Medieval Queenship, 1998, pp. 79–92

9th-century births
10th-century deaths
Navarrese royal consorts
10th-century women rulers
10th-century viceregal rulers
House of Íñiguez
10th-century people from the Kingdom of Pamplona
10th-century Spanish women
9th-century Spanish women
9th-century people from the Kingdom of Pamplona
Queen mothers